The Legislative Assembly of Rio Grande do Norte is the unicameral legislature of the State of Rio Grande do Norte in Brazil. It is composed of 24 state deputies who are elected by proportional representation.

The legislature was founded on February 2, 1835. It began its 60th term in 2011. The legislature is currently located in the Plaza September 7 in Cidade Alta, Natal.

External links
Official website

Rio Grande do Norte
Rio Grande do Norte
Rio Grande do Norte